The Minister for Security and Immigration was a junior ministerial position in the Home Office. The post was created on 8 February 2014 by combining the roles of Minister for Security and Minister of State for Immigration, following the resignation of the Minister for Immigration Mark Harper MP. James Brokenshire MP, then the Minister for Security, assumed the enlarged role. Brokenshire has a permanent seat on the National Security Council (NSC).

In 2015, the post was abolished, and two new roles were formed - Minister for Security and Minister of State for Immigration.

The minister is responsible for overseeing HM Passport Office, UK Visas and Immigration and Border Force.

Ministers

References

Security
2014 establishments in the United Kingdom
2016 disestablishments in the United Kingdom
Home Office (United Kingdom)